Emily Borie Hartshorne Mudd (September 6, 1898 – May 2, 1998), was an early family expert, a women's rights activist and birth control advocate.

Education 
Emily Mudd attended Vassar. She earned a master's degree as well as a doctorate from the University of Pennsylvania.

Birth control advocacy 
In 1927 Mudd founded Philadelphia's first birth control clinic. Knowing there was a law on the books in the city of Philadelphia barring pregnant women from being imprisoned, a pregnant Mudd worked to create this clinic. She published an article about early family planning in the February 1931 edition of the Birth Control Review.

Family counseling work 
In 1933 Mudd helped create the Philadelphia Marriage Council. According to the New York Times, Mudd "...helped lay the groundwork for virtually every aspect of professional marriage and family counseling."

Work on the Kinsey Report 
In addition to her counseling work, Mudd was also a consulting editor on Alfred Kinsey's Report on the Human Female.

Teaching career 
Mudd was the first woman to become a full professor at the University of Pennsylvania's medical school. Before her appointment in 1956 to a full professorship, she was appointed in 1952 to an assistant professorship of family study in psychiatry, becoming the third woman on the medical school's faculty.

Work with Planned Parenthood 
Emily Hartshorne Mudd was heavily involved in the creation of the Planned Parenthood Association of Philadelphia.

Personal life 
Email Hartshorne Mudd was married to University of Pennsylvania professor Dr. Stuart Mudd. They were married for fifty years until he died in 1975. The couple had sons named Harvey and John and daughters named Emily and Peggy. Mudd was voted mother of the year by the Philadelphia Inquirer in 1961. She lived to the age of 99 and had ten grandchildren.

External links

References

1898 births
1998 deaths
American birth control activists
The Baldwin School alumni
American women's rights activists
American feminists
University of Pennsylvania alumni

Members of the American Philosophical Society